A special election was held in  December 15–17, 1812 to fill a vacancy left by the resignation of Robert Le Roy Livingston (F) on May 6, 1812

Election returns

There was no opposition to Grosvenor.  Grosvenor took his seat on January 29, 1813.

See also
List of special elections to the United States House of Representatives

References

New York 1812 06
New York 1812 06
1812 06
New York 06
United States House of Representatives 06
United States House of Representatives 1812 06